The Ryan House and Lost Horse Well are historic ruins in Joshua Tree National Park, California, United States. It was established by the family of J.D. Ryan, the later developers of the Lost Horse Mine, which became the most profitable mine in the area.

The six-room house was built as an adobe residence in 1896 with later wood frame additions. It was destroyed by fire August 12, 1978. Adobe walls sit on stone masonry foundation, and there are concrete stoops on the north and south sides. There is a small stone fireplace located on the east side of the house.

A small cemetery is near the ranch with about 10 graves.

References

 

Adobe buildings and structures in California
National Register of Historic Places in Joshua Tree National Park
Ruins in the United States
National Register of Historic Places in Riverside County, California
1890s architecture in the United States
Historic districts on the National Register of Historic Places in California